Gil Simmons is the Chief weekday morning meteorologist for WTNH-TV, the local ABC-affiliated television station for the Hartford-New Haven, Connecticut television market. He also is the meteorologist for WTNH's sister station, WCTX-TV, the MyNetworkTV-affiliated television station in that market. On August 26, 2015, Simmons was named Chief Meteorologist of WTNH-TV.

In October 2017 Simmons; schedule was shifted from the weekday morning and mid-day noon broadcasts to weekday mornings.

He also served on active duty in the United States Marine Corps as a meteorologist/oceanographer for six years (1990-1996). He then moved back to Connecticut to forecast the weather locally, and started at WTNH in February 2003. Simmmons currently resides in Windham County, Connecticut.

Simmons received an Emmy nomination for his snowstorm coverage in Connecticut and was awarded 2002 Best Weathercast in Connecticut by the Associated Press.

A native of Foster, Rhode Island and Killingly, Connecticut, Simmons is a graduate of Western Connecticut State University, a member of the American Meteorological Society with the television seal of approval, and a member of the National Weather Association.

Simmons is an avid snowmobiler and frequently makes trips up to northern New England during the winter months. Other hobbies include motorcycle riding, skiing, landscaping, and big trucks. He also maintains his own weather website, in his spare time.

Simmons also sets time aside to participate in a variety of community fundraisers and events. He jumps into an icy lake every Thanksgiving Day morning to help raise money for muscular dystrophy. He is also active with the Multiple Sclerosis Society, American Heart Association, North Haven Education Foundation, Red Cross, participates in the annual walk to help find a cure for Alzheimer's disease, and numerous other charities. He is committed to honoring the veteran and military community.  He also has ridden his Harley in breast cancer benefit rides.

Gil provides weather forecasts for WTNH-TV weekday mornings from 4:00-7:00 A.M. and 9:00-10:00 A.M.

References

External links
Gil Simmons's biography at WTNH.com 
Gil Simmons's personal weather website, Weather4Connecticut.com

American meteorologists
Living people
Year of birth missing (living people)
Western Connecticut State University alumni